The Judicial Investigation Department (Spanish: Organismo de Investigación Judicial, OIJ) of Costa Rica is a dependency of the Supreme Court of Justice which works in collaboration with the Public Prosecutor of Costa Rica. The department was founded in 1973. Since October 2015, its director has been Walter Espinoza Espinoza.

The department is a subsidiary body of the Public Prosecutor of Costa Rica which conducts the agency's criminal investigations in order to guarantee the impartiality, honesty and objectivity of its investigations. The Organic Law of Costa stipulates that the OIJ should act independently and on their own initiative. It is given the authority to identity criminal offenders and to preform the preventive apprehension of alleged offenders. The department also collects, secures, and manages the evidence and other background information necessary for the investigation.

Organisational structure 
The administration of the department is overseen by the General Directorate and the General Secretariat. The General Directorate manages the entire organisation and coordinates interdepartmental activities. The General Secretariat oversees the organisation's budget and the allocation of resources and people to its respective departments. The organisations internal departments include the Department of Criminal Investigations and the Department of Forensics.

Criminal Investigations Department 
The Criminal Investigation Department is responsible for searching for and collecting the necessary  evidence to construct a criminal case. The deparment also oversees the Museum of Criminology, which is located in the building of the OIJ in the First Judicial Circuit of San Jose. It is composed of the following divisions: 

 Crimes 
 Frauds
 Economic and Financial Crimes 
 Narcotics 
 Homicides
 Property crime
 Thefts
 Assaults and vehicles theft support division
 Juvenile delinquency division
 Transit specialists
 Various crimes and kidnappings division
 Sexual Crimes
 Family and Against Life
 Complaint reception
 Incarceration and transportations
 Police Service Immediate Intervention (SPII)
 Plans and Operations 
 Research Background Screeners  
 Armory

Department of Forensics 
The Forensics department is located Forensic Complex in San Joaquín de Flores. It's primary function is to carry out the autopsies and other scientific examinations. The Forensic Science Laboratory technically analyzes each of the evidence gathered during investigations, conducting counterfeiting detection, forensic biology, biochemistry, ballistics, analytical chemistry, toxicology, navigational transit, planimetry, and the analysis of photo and video evidence.

The Department of Forensics is composed of several different divisions specializing in: 
 Medical jurisprudence
 Forensic pathology
 Psychiatry and psychology
 Occupational medicine
 Evidence storage
 Canine Unit

Criticism
The OIJ has been criticized for its illegal surveillance of Diario Extra journalist Manuel Estrada, who had written an article critical of the OIJ. In a victory for press freedom and citizen journalists, Judge Ernesto Jinesta Lobo of the Constitutional Chamber of the Supreme Court condemned the OIJ for conducting illegal wiretaps to identify the sources used by Estrada for his article. In addition to bona-fide journalists, Judge Lobo ruled that citizen journalists (those who “regularly contribute” to reporting or public opinion) also have the right to be shielded from prosecutorial abuses of surveillance. Further criticism of the department has stemmed from its practice of automatic dismissal of investigations related to intellectual property crimes up until 2011.

See also 
 Supreme Court of Justice of Costa Rica 
 Public Prosecutor of Costa Rica

References 

Institutions of Costa Rica
Law of Costa Rica
Organizations established in 1973
Supreme Court of Justice of Costa Rica